The Yunlin Story House (also Yunlin Storyhouse) is a historic building in Huwei Township, Yunlin County, Taiwan.

History
The museum building was originally constructed in 1920–1923 and opened for the residence of the Huwei County Magistrate of the Japanese government. After the handover of Taiwan back to China in 1945, the building was used for the residence of Huwei District Director.

In 2004, it underwent a restoration and completed in October 2006 as the Yunlin Story House. It was opened to the public a month later in November 2006.

Exhibitions
The museum has the following exhibit areas:
 Living Space
 Service Space
 Passage Ways

See also
 List of museums in Taiwan

References

External links

 

1923 establishments in Taiwan
Museums established in 2006
Houses completed in 1923
Art museums and galleries in Taiwan
History museums in Taiwan
Historic house museums in Taiwan
Houses in Taiwan
Museums in Yunlin County